Belgium competed at the 2014 European Athletics Championships in Zürich, Switzerland, between 12 and 17 August 2014. A delegation of 35 athletes were sent to represent the country.

Medals

Results

Men

Track & road events

1only the heats
2only the final

Field Events

Combined events – Decathlon

Women

Track & road events

Combined events – Heptathlon

References

Nations at the 2014 European Athletics Championships
2014
European Athletics Championships